Agostino Coletto (14 August 1927 – 1 June 2016) was an Italian racing cyclist.

Major results

1953
3rd Grand Prix des Nations
1954
1st Stage 2 Roma-Napoli-Roma
1st Milano–Torino
2nd Tour de Suisse
5th Giro di Lombardia
1955
1st Stage 3 Roma-Napoli-Roma
5th Giro d'Italia
1956
3rd Giro d'Italia
1958
1st Milano–Torino
1959
3rd Milano–Torino
1960
10th Giro d'Italia

References

1927 births
2016 deaths
Italian male cyclists
People from Avigliana
Cyclists from Piedmont
Sportspeople from the Metropolitan City of Turin